Howrah Union is an Indian multisports club based in the city of Kolkata, whose football team competes in the Calcutta Football League. The club previously competed in Super Division of CFL. Their cricket team plays in the CAB tournaments.

History
Howrah Union club was formed in 1922, by Panchanon Choungda from Amta, Howrah. Initially they played football at Howrah Maidan and eventually got affiliation from the Indian Football Association and joined the Calcutta Football League. They got promoted to the First Division in 1929 and won the Trades Cup in 1932. In the 1936 IFA Shield, they went till the semi-finals by defeating the 1933 winners Duke of Cornwall's Light Infantry.

They shifted to their current ground at the Kolkata Maidan in 1962 which they share with Mohammedan Sporting. Russi Mody, the former chairman and managing director of Tata Steel and a prominent member of the Tata Group was a longtime President of the club.

Notable players
Notable players who have played or have started their careers at the club include Sailen Manna, Arun Ghosh, Ashok Chatterjee, Mohammad Abdus Sattar, Poongam Kannan.

Home ground
Howrah Union uses Mohammedan Sporting—Howrah Union Ground for its sporting events.

Honours

Domestic
Stafford Cup
Winners (1): 1964
Bordoloi Trophy
Runners-up (1): 1962
Trades Cup
Winners (3): 1932, 2011, 2018
Runners-up (2): 2012, 2019
Cooch Behar Cup
Winners (1): 1967

Other departments

Men's cricket
Howrah Union has its men's cricket section, which is affiliated with the Cricket Association of Bengal, and competes in the CAB Second Division League.

Men's hockey
Men's hockey team of the club is affiliated to Bengal Hockey Association (known as 'Hocke Bengal'), and competes in the Calcutta Hockey League.

References

Further reading

Bibliography

Ghosh, Saurindra Kumar. Krira Samrat Nagendraprasad Sarbadhikary 1869–1940 (Calcutta: N. P. Sarbadhikary Memorial Committee, 1963) (hereafter Krira Samrat).

Others

From recreation to competition: Early history of Indian football . pp. 124–141. Published online: 6 Aug 2006. Taylor & Francis. Retrieved 30 June 2021.

External links
 Clubs at IFA

Association football clubs established in 1922
1922 establishments in India
Football clubs in Kolkata
Sports clubs in India
Multi-sport clubs in India